This article lists the Ministers of the Interior of Catalonia.

List

References

External links
 

 
Interior